Ófærufoss is a waterfall situated in the Eldgjá chasm in the western part of Vatnajökull National Park, Iceland.  Until the early 1990s a natural bridge spanned the falls, but it collapsed from natural causes.

References 

Collapsed arches
Katla (volcano)
Waterfalls of Iceland